The Polokwane Local Municipality (or simply Polokwane Municipality) is a local municipality located within the Capricorn District in the Limpopo Province of South Africa. It shares its name with the city of Polokwane (formerly Pietersburg).

Polokwane Municipality accounts for 3% of the total surface area of Limpopo; however, over 10% of the population of Limpopo resides within its boundaries.  The Municipality serves as the economic hub of Limpopo and has the highest population density in the Capricorn district. In terms of its physical composition Polokwane Municipality is 23% urbanised and 71% rural.  The largest sector of the community within the municipality resides in rural tribal villages, followed by urban settlements.

Cities and settlements 
The municipal spatial pattern reflects that of the historic apartheid city model, characterised by segregated settlement.  At the centre of the area is the Polokwane economic hub, which comprises the central business district, industrial area, and a range of social services and well-established formal urban areas servicing the more affluent residents of Polokwane.

Situated on the outskirts in several clusters are less formal settlement areas, which are experiencing enormous influx from rural urban migration trends.  These areas are in dire need of upgraded services and infrastructure, both social and engineering, and are struggling to cope with the informal influx of more and more people who want access to an improved quality and standard of living.

Main places
The 2001 census divided the municipality into the following main places:

Politics 

The municipal council consists of ninety members elected by mixed-member proportional representation. Forty-five councillors are elected by first-past-the-post voting in forty-five wards, while the remaining forty-five are chosen from party lists so that the total number of party representatives is proportional to the number of votes received. In the election of 1 November 2021 the African National Congress (ANC) won a majority of fifty-six seats on the council.

The following table shows the results of the election:

Demographics 
As of 2007, the Polokwane Local Municipality was home to approximately 561,772 people. Growth figures from 1996 to 2001 showed that the municipal population increased by about 3.27% per year on average.  Much of this growth is ascribed to an influx of people from other, more rural, municipal areas into Polokwane, where the perception of more employment and greater economic wealth exists.

79% of its households are using electricity for lighting, 62% for cooking, and 58% for heating.

In 2007, 94.1% of the population was Black African, 4.8% White, 1.1% Coloured, Indian or Asian.

Racial groups

Education 
The Turfloop campus of the University of Limpopo is located in Mankweng and the Tshwane University of Technology has a satellite campus in Polokwane.

Although the municipality's overall level of education has improved slightly in recent years, only 24% of the population have attained a Grade 12 education, and only 5.7% have achieved a tertiary education qualification.  As a result of low education levels and a largely unskilled population, large numbers of residents earn very little or no income, and poverty is a major problem in the municipal area.

References

External links 
 Polokwane Municipality: Official Website* 

Local municipalities of the Capricorn District Municipality